Arne Norrback (born 14 December 1937) is a Swedish weightlifter. He competed in the men's featherweight event at the 1976 Summer Olympics. Born in Lumijoki, Finland, Norrback moved to Sweden in 1961.

References

1937 births
Living people
Swedish male weightlifters
Olympic weightlifters of Sweden
Weightlifters at the 1976 Summer Olympics
People from Lumijoki
Finnish emigrants to Sweden
20th-century Swedish people